New Augusta is a town in Perry County, Mississippi. It is part of the Hattiesburg, Mississippi Metropolitan Statistical Area. The population was 644 at the 2010 census. It is the county seat of Perry County. New Augusta is located about two miles south of "Old" Augusta, which was the county seat until 1906.

Geography
New Augusta is located at  (31.204062, -89.031957).

Demographics

2020 census

As of the 2020 United States census, there were 554 people, 238 households, and 165 families residing in the town.

2000 census
As of the census of 2000, there were 715 people, 252 households, and 190 families residing in the town. The population density was 138.5 people per square mile (53.5/km). There were 292 housing units at an average density of 56.5 per square mile (21.8/km). The racial makeup of the town was 63.64% White, 34.97% African American, 0.28% Native American, 0.14% from other races, and 0.98% from two or more races. Hispanic or Latino of any race were 0.42% of the population.

There were 252 households, out of which 42.1% had children under the age of 18 living with them, 49.6% were married couples living together, 19.8% had a female householder with no husband present, and 24.6% were non-families. 21.4% of all households were made up of individuals, and 6.0% had someone living alone who was 65 years of age or older. The average household size was 2.74 and the average family size was 3.21.

In the town, the population was spread out, with 31.5% under the age of 18, 10.6% from 18 to 24, 30.3% from 25 to 44, 19.6% from 45 to 64, and 8.0% who were 65 years of age or older. The median age was 31 years. For every 100 females, there were 108.5 males. For every 100 females age 18 and over, there were 100.8 males.

The median income for a household in the town was $27,500, and the median income for a family was $31,477. Males had a median income of $28,750 versus $17,917 for females. The per capita income for the town was $13,333. About 19.0% of families and 19.9% of the population were below the poverty line, including 27.0% of those under age 18 and 16.2% of those age 65 or over.

Education
The Town of New Augusta is served by the Perry County School District.

See also
 Mahned Bridge
 James Copeland (outlaw)

References

Towns in Perry County, Mississippi
Towns in Mississippi
County seats in Mississippi
Hattiesburg metropolitan area